Michael Dwayne Dennis (born June 6, 1958) is a former American football defensive back in the National Football League who played for the New York Giants, New York Jets and San Diego Chargers. He played college football for the Wyoming Cowboys.

Dennis had five interceptions as an undrafted rookie in 1980.

NFL career statistics

References

External links
Pro Football Reference profile

1958 births
Living people
American football defensive backs
New York Giants players
New York Jets players
San Diego Chargers players
Wyoming Cowboys football players